Santa Cruz District is one of six districts of the province Alto Amazonas in Peru.

References

Districts of the Alto Amazonas Province
Districts of the Loreto Region
1866 establishments in Peru